Simkin de Pio (born March 17, 1976, in Quezon City) is a Filipino painter, conservator and restorer. The eldest son of renowned Filipino realist painter Gig de Pio and Fe Esterlina, his siblings include Las Vegas-based painter Gig Jr. and Manila-based painter Vincent de Pio.

In 1994 de Pio graduated from the Ateneo de Manila High School and in 1998 entered the University of the Philippines College of Fine Arts in Diliman where he studied under the tutelage of such Philippine art stalwarts as Roberto Feleo and Roberto Chabet. After finishing his Bachelor of Fine Arts degree in Painting, de Pio worked as a graphic artist and illustrator at the UP NISMED, the AMA Computer University head office, and Petplan, later teaching at the De La Salle–College of Saint Benilde School of Design and the Arts as well as at Xavier School (on top of duties as a graphic designer).

According to Icons of Rock, de Pio's artworks "offer unique insights into the human condition in a narrative of forms and color that breathe life into thoughts, concepts and emotions from which emerge a striking realism". De Pio uses different kinds of medium, although most of his works have been in oil, acrylic, pastel and charcoal.

De Pio was once an artist for Manila's FormaFuego Artist Space. He currently maintains a studio, Prometheus Atelier, in Quezon City. Recently he also taught at FEATI University's fine arts department and volunteered as a managing editor for the emerging art e-zine diskurso art magazine and principal photographer for the YouTube Diskurso Art Magazine channel.



Achievements

Art exhibitions

Group exhibitions

Solo exhibition 

Personification was the title of de Pio's first solo art exhibition, held at Galerie Astra and later at The Room Upstairs in Makati City in January 2007.

See also 
 Vincent de Pio

References

External links 
 Simkin de Pio on Fine Art America
 Simkin de Pio artist profile - Langkawi Art Biennale
 Simkin de Pio on LinkedIn

1976 births
Artists from Metro Manila
Filipino painters
Living people
People from Quezon City
University of the Philippines Diliman alumni